Keiser is a derivation of the Germanic Kaiser surname. It may refer to:

People  
 César Keiser (1925–2007), Swiss artist
 Laurence B. Keiser (1895–1969), a U.S. Army major general who commanded the 2nd Infantry Division in the Korean War
 Max Keiser (born 1960), a film-maker, broadcaster and former broker and activist
 Raphaela Keiser (born 1997), Swiss curler
 Reinhard Keiser (1674–1739), German composer
 Stephan Keiser, Swiss curler and curling coach

Places 
 Keiser, Arkansas
 Keiser, Oregon, part of the Salem-Keiser metroplex
 Keiser, Northumberland County, Pennsylvania

See also 
 Kaiser (disambiguation)